The Little Colonel (Spanish: El pequeño coronel) is a 1960 Spanish historical musical film directed by Antonio del Amo and starring Joselito, Carlos Larrañaga and María Mahor.

Cast

References

Bibliography 
 de España, Rafael. Directory of Spanish and Portuguese film-makers and films. Greenwood Press, 1994.

External links 
 

1960s historical musical films
Spanish historical musical films
1960 films
1960s Spanish-language films
Films directed by Antonio del Amo
Films produced by Cesáreo González
1960s Spanish films